St. Mary's High School is a private coeducational Roman Catholic high school in Natchitoches, Louisiana located in the Diocese of Alexandria.

Extracurricular activities
Extracurricular activities include quiz bowl, 4-H, drama club, FCA, FBLA, BETA, and student council. Student organizations perform community service, attend conferences and conventions, sponsor activities on campus, and participate in fundraising.

Athletics
St. Mary's athletics competes in the LHSAA. St. Mary's mascot is the tiger, and its school colors are blue and white. 

Sports sponsored by the school include: football, girls' and boys' basketball, baseball, softball, track and field, cross country, tennis, golf, danceline, baton twirling, and cheerleading.

Athletics history
The sports teams have been successful as of late, including three straight district championships in basketball (including a trip to the second round of the class 1A state playoffs in 2009-2010 and 2010-2011 and a trip to the quarterfinals in 2011-2012), and district championships in football in both 2009-2010 and 2010-2011 (including trips to the second round of the playoffs in both years). The baseball team as well as the men's track and field team have won the district championship over five years in a row each.

Championships
Football championships
(2) State Championships: 1977, 2015

Baseball championships
(1) State Championship: 2011

Notable alumni
 Eugene P. Watson - Former head librarian and professor of library science at Northwestern State University

References

External links
 School Website
Diocese website

Catholic secondary schools in Louisiana
Schools in Natchitoches Parish, Louisiana
Buildings and structures in Natchitoches, Louisiana
Private middle schools in Louisiana
Private elementary schools in Louisiana